Hero (released in the United Kingdom, Ireland and Australia as Accidental Hero) is a 1992 American comedy-drama film directed by Stephen Frears. It was written by David Webb Peoples from a story written by Peoples, Laura Ziskin and Alvin Sargent and stars Dustin Hoffman, Geena Davis, Andy García, Joan Cusack and Chevy Chase (uncredited). Following the critically acclaimed The Grifters (1990), it was the second American feature film by British filmmaker Frears.

Plot

Bernie LaPlante is a pickpocket and petty criminal who anonymously rescues survivors including TV reporter Gale Gayley at an airplane crash. At the same time he also steals her purse, losing a shoe in the process. After his car breaks down, he flags down John Bubber, a homeless Vietnam veteran, and tells him about the rescue at the crash site, giving him his remaining shoe. When Deke, Gale's television station news director, offers $1 million to the "Angel of Flight 104", Bernie realizes he can't claim the reward, due to his arrest while fencing credit cards he stole from the people he rescued. John contacts Gale, recounting Bernie's tale of the rescue, and provides the single shoe to take credit for the selfless act.

When Bernie tries to tell people that John is a fake, the media, after sensationalizing his heroic image, will not believe Bernie. Bernie is released from jail and his lawyer informed him that he will be heading to prison soon because of the stolen goods he carried in his apartment. Gale, as one of the crash survivors, considers herself to be in John's debt and soon grooms his public image. She finds herself falling in love with him even though she has questions about his authenticity. Despite his reluctant acceptance of his fame, he turns out to be a decent person, using his fame and reward money to help sick children and the homeless.

John finds himself in an ethical dilemma since his persona is inspirational to countless people. Meanwhile, Bernie continues to aggravate his ex-wife, Evelyn, and fails to bond with his son, Joey, who is now enamored with John. He begins to feel that if Joey is going to idolize anyone, perhaps John is the better choice.

A police detective tells Gale her credit cards were recovered during Bernie's arrest. She and her cameraman, Chucky, break into Bernie's apartment with the help of Winston, the landlord. While searching for evidence to incriminate Bernie, Gale finds a stolen Silver Microphone Award that she won in New York City, the night before the crash. Bernie arrives only to be confronted by her, who speculates that John stole her purse in a moment of weakness during the rescue, sold it to Bernie, and accuses him of attempting to now blackmail John. They are interrupted by Winston, who says John is on television, about to commit suicide by jumping from the ledge of a high-rise skyscraper.

Gale rushes to the scene and brings Bernie along, threatening to have him prosecuted if John leaps to his death. She demands Bernie apologize for the attempted blackmail. Evelyn and Joey rush there as well, with Evelyn reminiscing how Bernie is selfish and cynical, but always becomes a great person in a crisis. Bernie goes out on the ledge, hatching a scheme to milk the media attention for all its worth. He convinces John that the world needs a hero, and that he is clearly the right one for the job, though he does negotiate a discreet share of the $1 million to pay for his son's college tuition and a letter to the judge to put in a good word for him to suspend his prison sentence. When Bernie slips off the ledge, John grabs him and pulls him to safety, a (true) hero once more. When Gale sees Bernie's face covered with dirt, as on the night of the crash, she realizes it was he who saved her. She confronts him "off the record" with her supposition, but he insists that John was the hero.

As Gale leaves, she thanks Bernie for saving her life; and he reflexively replies, "You're welcome." She tells him to tell Joey the truth. John agrees to continue playing the part of public hero. While on an excursion to the zoo, Bernie decides to tell Joey the true story of the crash. After he does so, a lady cries out that her daughter has fallen into the lion's cage. Joey pleads with him to help, to which he sighs, slips off his shoes, and heads off to see what he can do.

Cast

Several prominent performers appear uncredited. Joan Cusack’s sister, Susie Cusack, appears as public defender Donna O'Day. Edward Herrmann appears as Mr. Broadman, a suicide victim. Jeff Garlin appears as a news vendor. Fisher Stevens appears as a Channel 4 director.

Production

Principal photography on the film began shooting October 30, 1991 in Chicago with studio work at Sony Pictures Studios, Culver City, California and Los Angeles, California, along with the crash scene on location at Piru, California. It wrapped on March 20, 1992.

The colossal staging of a crashed Boeing 727 airplane in December 1991, involved creating a complete location set at Piru, California. The derelict  fuselage was blown up over a bridge and recreated river and river bed. After the failure of the first explosion, a second rigged explosive realistically recreated the crash scene where the plane is torn apart.

Influences
Hail the Conquering Hero (1944) is a film on a similar theme by Preston Sturges. Many reviewers referred to the obvious similarities between Hero and Sturges' screwball comedies. The classic Frank Capra film Meet John Doe (1941) was also cited as a model for Laura Ziskin who both produced and supplied the story for Hero.

Reception

Box office
In the United States and Canada the film grossed $19.5 million. Internationally, it grossed $47 million, for a worldwide total of $67 million. Columbia lost $25.6 million on it.

Critical response
On Rotten Tomatoes the film holds a 67% rating based on 21 reviews. 
On Metacritic, it has a weighted average score of 61 out of 100 based on reviews from 25 critics, indicating "generally favorable reviews". Audiences surveyed by CinemaScore gave the film a grade "A-" on scale of A to F.

Kenneth Turan of the Los Angeles Times wrote: "Haphazard and erratic, involving only in fits and starts, Hero's core is nevertheless so shrewdly and gleefully cynical about public heroism and the cult of celebrity it is impossible not to be at least sporadically amused and entertained."
Roger Ebert noted: "It has all the ingredients for a terrific entertainment, but it lingers over the kinds of details that belong in a different kind of movie. It comes out of the tradition of those rat-a-tat Preston Sturges comedies of the 1940s, and when Chevy Chase, as a wise-guy TV boss, barks orders into a phone, it finds the right note." Desson Howe of The Washington Post said: "If a hero is one who perseveres and never gives up, this is one "Hero" that should have quit when it was ahead."

Accolades
The film is recognized by American Film Institute in these lists:
 2003: AFI's 100 Years...100 Heroes & Villains:
 Bernie LaPlante - Nominated Hero
 2006: AFI's 100 Years...100 Cheers – Nominated

Home media
The film debuted at No. 3 in home media market. It was released on VHS on April 15, 1993. Another version presented in widescreen was also released on VHS. The DVD was also released on May 25, 1999 and was later re-released in 2004 by Sony Pictures. Special features for the 1999 DVD only included liner notes and theatrical trailers. The DVD was also a flipper disc and was presented in widescreen (side A) and full-screen (side B). The only special feature for the 2004 DVD included theatrical trailers and was only presented in full-screen. Mill Creek Entertainment had recently picked up the DVD distribution rights for it. The DVD was re-released in 2012 (20 years after it was released). Unlike the first two DVD releases by Sony, this one includes no special features and is presented in widescreen with an aspect ratio of 1.85:1.

References

Bibliography

 Beck, Simon. The Aircraft-Spotter's Film and Television Companion. Jefferson, North Carolina: McFarland & Co. Inc. Publishing, 2016. .
 Griffin, Nancy and Kim Masters. Hit and Run. New York: Touchstone, a Simon & Schuster company, 1996. .

External links
 
 

1992 films
1992 comedy-drama films
American comedy-drama films
American aviation films
Films set on airplanes
Columbia Pictures films
Films scored by George Fenton
Films directed by Stephen Frears
Films with screenplays by Alvin Sargent
Films with screenplays by David Peoples
Films about television
1990s English-language films
1990s American films